is a Japanese-language daily newspaper published by The Minato-Yamaguchi Co., Ltd. Headquartered in Shimonoseki, Yamaguchi. It was first published in Shimonoseki in 1946.

Corporate profile

The Minato-Yamaguchi Co., Ltd.
Publishing newspapers : Yamaguchi Shimbun, Minato Shimbun, etc.

Location
Shimonoseki Head Office
1-1-7, Higashi-Yamato-machi, Shimonoseki, Yamaguchi, Japan
Tokyo, Osaka, Hiroshima, Shunan, Yamaguchi, Ube, Iwakuni, Yanai, Hofu, Hagi, Nagato, Mine, Sanyo-Onoda, Toyota, Toyoura

External links
Yamaguchi Shimbun in Japanese

1946 establishments in Japan
Newspapers established in 1946
Daily newspapers published in Japan
Japanese-language newspapers
Yamaguchi Prefecture
Mass media in Shimonoseki